Pistols at Dawn is the second album by Aqueduct. The five-song EP was released October 12, 2004 on Barsuk Records.

Track listing
"Hardcore Days & Softcore Nights" – 3:53
"Dinner Mints"
"As Close As Your Girlfriend Is Far Away"
"Tension (Piano Verite)"
"Who Wanna Rock?"

2004 EPs
Aqueduct (band) albums
Barsuk Records EPs